Rudolf Bachmann (10 August 1925 in Westheim – 27 March 1998 in Gunzenhausen) was a German politician, representative of the Christian Social Union of Bavaria. He was a member of the Landtag of Bavaria.

Honors
 1980 Bavarian Order of Merit

See also
List of Bavarian Christian Social Union politicians

References

1925 births
1998 deaths
People from Weißenburg-Gunzenhausen
German Lutherans
Christian Social Union in Bavaria politicians
Officers Crosses of the Order of Merit of the Federal Republic of Germany
20th-century Lutherans